Microglanis is a genus of fish in the family Pseudopimelodidae native to South America. This genus has the widest distribution within its family, with species ranging from the Guianas to  Venezuela; western slope of the Andes in Ecuador and Peru to the Río de La Plata basin in Argentina. They occur eastward to the Orinoco and Amazon basins. It is also present in the eastern coastal rivers of Brazil.

Species
There are currently 29 recognized species in this genus: 
 Microglanis ater C. G. E. Ahl, 1936
 Microglanis carlae Vera-Alcaraz, da Graça & Shibatta, 2008 
 Microglanis cibelae L. R. Malabarba & Mahler, 1998
 Microglanis cottoides (Boulenger, 1891)
 Microglanis eurystoma L. R. Malabarba & Mahler, 1998
 Microglanis garavelloi Shibatta & Benine, 2005
 Microglanis iheringi A. L. Gomes, 1946
 Microglanis leniceae Shibatta, 2016 
 Microglanis leptostriatus H. Mori & Shibatta, 2006 
 Microglanis lundbergi Jarduli & Shibatta, 2013 
 Microglanis maculatus Shibatta, 2014 
 Microglanis malabarbai Bertaco & A. R. Cardoso, 2005
 Microglanis minutus Ottoni, Mattos & Barbosa, 2010 
 Microglanis nigripinnis Bizerril & Peres-Neto, 1992
 Microglanis nigrolineatus Terán, Jarduli, F. Alonso, Mirande & Shibatta, 2016 
 Microglanis oliveirai W. B. G. Ruiz & Shibatta, 2011 
 Microglanis parahybae (Steindachner, 1880)
 Microglanis pataxo Sarmento-Soares, Martins-Pinheiro, Aranda & Chamon, 2006 
 Microglanis pellopterygius Mees, 1978
 Microglanis pleriqueater Mattos, Ottoni & Barbosa, 2013 
 Microglanis poecilus C. H. Eigenmann, 1912 
 Microglanis reikoae W. B. G. Ruiz, 2016 
 Microglanis robustus W. B. G. Ruiz & Shibatta, 2010 
 Microglanis secundus Mees, 1974
 Microglanis sparsus W. B. G. Ruiz, 2016 
 Microglanis variegatus C. H. Eigenmann & Henn, 1914
 Microglanis xerente W. B. G. Ruiz, 2016 
 Microglanis xylographicus W. B. G. Ruiz & Shibatta, 2011 
 Microglanis zonatus C. H. Eigenmann & W. R. Allen, 1942

References

Pseudopimelodidae
Fish of South America
Fish of the Amazon basin
Taxa named by Carl H. Eigenmann
Freshwater fish genera
Catfish genera